The Paul Deneau Trophy was presented annually to the World Hockey Association's most gentlemanly player.

It was named in honour of Paul Deneau, founder the Dayton Aeros hockey club.

Winners
1973 – Ted Hampson, Minnesota Fighting Saints
1974 – Ralph Backstrom, Chicago Cougars
1975 – Mike Rogers, Edmonton Oilers
1976 – Vaclav Nedomansky, Toronto Toros
1977 – Dave Keon, New England Whalers
1978 – Dave Keon, New England Whalers
1979 – Kent Nilsson, Winnipeg Jets

World Hockey Association trophies and awards